Miss Denmark is a national Beauty pageant in Denmark. The pageant was founded in 1926, where the winners were sent to Miss Universe and other titleholders to Miss World, Miss International and Miss Supranational.

Organization
The Miss Danmark pageant was established in 1926 when the country hosted its first national beauty contest whose winner was Edith Jørgensen. Between 1951 and 2003, Miss Denmark/Frøken Danmark selected one winner to represent Denmark at several major international beauty competitions. Among the famous Miss Danmarks include Aino Korva, Miss Danmark 1963.

From 1986 until 2013, Memborg models operated the contest. In 2015, the rights to hold the Miss Denmark national beauty pageant have been purchased by Lisa Lents (Miss World Denmark 2008) of Miss & Mister Denmark Org. The winner of Miss Denmark from now on will compete only at Miss World.

In 2013, the organization obtained the Miss Earth franchise license where they sent representatives in 2013 & 2014. After a few years break, they were back at working with Miss Earth in 2017 & 2018.

In 2018, the organization obtained the Miss Universe, Miss International, Miss Grand International & Miss Supranational franchise licenses. Since 2022, the winner of the pageant goes to Miss Universe, while the second place goes to Miss World.

Miss Universe Denmark
Between 1986 and 1995 Bo Andersen handled the Miss Universe Denmark franchise. From 1996 until 2013, Memborg Models with Lene Memborg operated the franchise. Starting in 2018, Lisa Lents took over the Miss Universe Denmark franchise. The winner of Miss Universe Denmark independent competition holds for the first time in 2019. In 2018 the Miss World Denmark 2016,  Helena Heuser won the pageant.

Aino Korva is the only Dane to place in the top 5 at Miss Universe and Žaklina Šojić is the last to place in the top 15, at Miss Universe in 2007.

Former Winners
Supermodel Helena Christensen began her career in 1986 as Miss Universe Denmark. In the same year, Pia Rosenberg Larsen won Miss Denmark and competed at Miss International, where she placed as first runner-up. In 1993, T.V. personality and actress Maria Hirse won Miss Universe Denmark, but like Helena Christensen, failed to place at Miss Universe.

Titleholders

 Winning International Title  
 Miss Universe Denmark
 Miss World Denmark
 Miss Supranational Denmark

Titleholders under Miss Danmark org.

Miss Universe Denmark

Denmark set to be at Miss Universe in 1952 under Miss Danmark Organization. In 1985 there was a special edition of Miss Universe Denmark. Began 1986 the main winners competed at Miss Universe again. Between 2015 and 2016 the Face of Denmark Org. selected the winners to Miss Universe. Since 2018 the Miss Danmark Org. by Lisa Lents sets a return to Denmark at Miss Universe. Denmark did not compete at Miss Universe in the following years: 1954–57, 1962, 1971, 1974, 1991, 1997–99, 2001–2003, 2009, 2014, and 2017.

Miss World Denmark

Miss Danmark debuted to Miss World in 1963. Prior to 1963 Danish's Miss World selected from another agency in Denmark.

Miss International Denmark

Miss International Denmark returned to Miss Danmark Organization in 2018. Prior to 2018 a Miss International Denmark awarded from National local selection for Miss International. Between 1960 and 1995 Miss Danmark sent delegate to the pageant. In 1986 Miss Denmark 1985, Pia Rosenberg Larsen placed 1st Runner-up and that year is the highest achievement for Denmark in Miss International history.

Miss Supranational Denmark

Miss Grand Denmark

See also
Mister Denmark

References

External links
 Official site

 
Denmark
Denmark
Denmark
Denmark
World
Recurring events established in 1924
Recurring events established in 2015
2015 establishments in Denmark
Danish awards
1926 establishments in Denmark